Vital statistics may refer to:

 Vital statistics (government records), a government database recording the births and deaths of individuals within that government's jurisdiction.
 Bust/waist/hip measurements, informally called vital statistics, measurements for the purpose of fitting clothes
 Vital signs, measures of various physiological statistics, often taken by health professionals, in order to assess the most basic body functions
 Vital Statistics (opera), a 1987 one-act opera about physiognomy, re-titled Facing Goya

See also
 Vitalstatistix (disambiguation)